The Battle of the Spring of Harod may refer to: 

 Israelite-Midianite battle at the Well of Harod (late Bronze Age), see Gideon#Biblical_narrative
 Battle of Ain Jalut (3 September 1260)